Capo Comino Lighthouse is an active lighthouse located on the easternmost promontory of Sardinia, in the municipality of Siniscola, on the Tyrrhenian Sea.

Description
The lighthouse is completely automated and operated by the Marina Militare with the identification code number 1230 E.F.

See also
 List of lighthouses in Italy
 Siniscola

References

External links

 Servizio Fari Marina Militare

Lighthouses in Italy
Buildings and structures in Sardinia